Hugh Burns (footballer) may refer to 

Jock Burns, born 1894, played for Renton Glencairn, St Anthony's (Glasgow), Dumbarton Harp, Rutherglen Glencairn, Dumbarton, Renton, Rochdale, East Stirlingshire and Oldham Athletic.
Hugh Burns, born 1965, played for Larkhall Academy, Cambuslang Rangers, Hamilton Academical, Heart of Midlothian, Dunfermline Athletic, Fulham, Kilmarnock, Ayr Utd, Dumbarton and Larkhall Thistle.